
 
 

Vivigani Ardune Conservation Park is a protected area located in the Australian state of South Australia in the locality of Lucindale about  south-east of the state capital of Adelaide and about  north-west of the town of Lucindale.

The conservation park consists of land described as “Allotment 1 of Filed Plan 18259” and which is located in the cadastral unit of the Hundred of Townsend. It came into existence on 20 March 2008 by proclamation under the National Parks and Wildlife Act 1972. The name which was approved on 17 July 2006 is derived from two nearby places – the Vivigani Sanctuary which is a private protected area declared under the above-mentioned act in 1974 and which occupies adjoining land to the conservation park's west, the south and the east, and the Ardune Range, a geographical feature.

In 2008, the conservation park was described by Gail Gago, the then Minister for Environment and Conservation as follows:Vivigani Ardune Conservation Park is well covered in intact native vegetation and provides an important link between other properties managed for conservation. The land contains regionally threatened vegetation associations (dryland tea-tree woodland and tussock grassland), regionally threatened flora (Blue Devil), and fauna of conservation significance, including the Yellow-tailed Black Cockatoo, the Little Lorikeet, the Diamond Firetail, and the Red-necked Wallaby.

The conservation park is classified as an IUCN Category III protected area.

See also
Protected areas of South Australia

References

External links
Vivigani Ardune Conservation Park webpage on the Protected Planet website

Conservation parks of South Australia
Protected areas established in 2008
2008 establishments in Australia
Limestone Coast